Rosemary Betterton (born 1951) is a feminist art historian who is recognized for her work in the field of Contemporary Art, particularly her inquiries into women's art practices.

Biography
Rosemary Betterton was born in 1951. She is British.

Betterton taught art history and critical studies at Sheffield Hallam University and served as a faculty member at University of Lancaster teaching in the areas of visual culture and feminist theory. She is Professor Emerita at Lancaster University.

Betterton is the author of many books and essays. Maternal Bodies in the Visual Arts analyzes images and texts to make the argument that pregnancy, in Western culture, is viewed and depicted with profound ambivalence by both feminists and non-feminists. Women, Artists and The Body presents a discussion of how twentieth century women have sought to understand and influence where they fit into Western culture and art.

Selected publications

Books 
 Maternal bodies in the visual arts (Manchester University Press, 2014)
 Unframed : practices and politics of women’s contemporary painting (Tauris, 2004)
 An intimate distance : women, artists, and the body (Routledge, 1996)
 Looking on : images of femininity in the visual arts and media. (Pandora Press, 1987)

Chapters 
 Why is my art not as good as me? Femininity, feminism and “ Life-drawing” in Tracey Emin's artin The art of Tracey Emin, Edited by: Merck, M . and Townsend, C. 22–39. London: Thames & Hudson.

References

1951 births
Living people
British art historians
Women art historians
British women historians
British feminists
British feminist writers
21st-century British women writers
20th-century British women writers
20th-century British writers